Estate Mount Victory, near Frederiksted on Saint Croix in the U.S. Virgin Islands, was listed on the National Register of Historic Places in 1978.

Ruins of a factory, an animal mill, a steam mill chimney, a wind mill, outbuildings and Mt. Victory School are on the property.

References

Windmills
Grinding mills in the United States Virgin Islands
Sugar plantations
Schools in the United States Virgin Islands
National Register of Historic Places in the United States Virgin Islands
Buildings and structures completed in 1849
Grinding mills on the National Register of Historic Places